Weston Favell Academy is a school in Northampton, England that caters for pupils aged 11 to 18. The academy was called Weston Favell Upper School prior to its takeover by the Greenwood Dale Foundation Trust (GDFT) on 1 September 2011.

Inspection judgements
As the result of an Ofsted inspection in 2016 deeming the school 'inadequate', it was placed in special measures. In 2018 another inspection judged the school to require improvement.

Notable former pupils 
Mark Bowden (English author), Author and body language expert
Alan Carr, comedian.  
Andrew Collins, broadcaster
Clive Lewis, politician
Michael Underwood, broadcaster
Ivan Toney, footballer
Jonathan Teckman, author

References

External links 
Weston Favell Academy official website

Academies in West Northamptonshire District
Secondary schools in West Northamptonshire District